Tiemenguan may refer to:

Iron Gate Pass, or Tiemenguan in Chinese
Tiemenguan City, named after the pass